Greene County is located in the U.S. state of Missouri. As of the 2020 census, its population was 298,915. making it the fourth most-populous county in Missouri. Its county seat and most-populous city is Springfield. The county was organized in 1833 and is named after American Revolutionary War General Nathanael Greene.

Greene County is included in the Springfield metropolitan area.

Geography

Adjacent counties
Polk County (north)
Dallas County (northeast)
Webster County (east)
Christian County (south)
Lawrence County (southwest)
Dade County (northwest)

National protected area
 Wilson's Creek National Battlefield

Demographics

As of the census of 2000, there were 240,391 people, 97,859 households, and 61,846 families residing in the county. The population density was 356 people per square mile (138/km2). There were 104,517 housing units at an average density of 155 per square mile (60/km2). The racial makeup of the county was 93.54% White, 2.26% Black or African American, 0.66% Native American, 1.13% Asian, 0.06% Pacific Islander, 0.67% from other races, and 1.68% from two or more races. Approximately 1.84% of the population were Hispanic or Latino of any race.

There were 97,859 households, out of which 28.30% had children under the age of 18 living with them, 50.00% were married couples living together, 9.80% had a female householder with no husband present, and 36.80% were non-families. 29.10% of all households were made up of individuals, and 9.70% had someone living alone who was 65 years of age or older. The average household size was 2.34 and the average family size was 2.89.

In the county, the population was spread out, with 22.30% under the age of 18, 13.80% from 18 to 24, 28.60% from 25 to 44, 21.80% from 45 to 64, and 13.60% who were 65 years of age or older. The median age was 35 years. For every 100 females, there were 94.40 males. For every 100 females age 18 and over, there were 91.20 males.

The median income for a household in the county was $44,185, and the median income for a family was $56,047. Males had a median income of $30,672 versus $21,987 for females. The per capita income for the county was $25,770. About 7.60% of families and 12.10% of the population were below the poverty line, including 13.60% of those under age 18 and 7.50% of those age 65 or over.

There are 190,417 registered voters in Greene County.

2020 Census

Emergency services
Republic and Springfield have city fire departments. Additionally, the county is served by the following fire districts:
Ash Grove
Battlefield
Billings
Bois D'arc
Brookline
Ebenezer
Fair Grove
Logan-Rogersville
Strafford
Walnut Grove
West Republic
Willard

Law enforcement is provided by the Greene County Sheriffs Office. The current sheriff is Jim C. Arnott.

Politics

Local
The Republican Party predominantly controls politics at the local level in Greene County.

State House of Representatives 

Greene County is divided into eight legislative districts in the Missouri House of Representatives; six of which are held by Republicans and two Democratic seats. 
District 130 — Bishop Davidson (R-Springfield). The district includes the northern part the city of Springfield and rural area of north-central Greene County.

District 131 — Bill Owen (R-Springfield). The district includes the northern part the city of Springfield and rural area of north-central Greene County.

District 132 — Crystal Quade (D-Springfield). The district is based entirely in the city of Springfield.

District 133 — Curtis Trent (R-Springfield). The district includes Battlefield and a part of the city of Springfield.

District 134 — Alex Riley (R-Springfield). The district includes part of the city of Springfield.

District 135 — Betsy Fogle (D-Springfield). The district exists entirely within the city of Springfield.

District 136 — Craig Fishel (R-Springfield). The district includes parts of the city of Springfield and some rural area southeast of the city.

District 137 — John Black (R-Marshfield). The district includes the communities of Fair Grove, Rogersville, and Strafford, as well as a large portion of Webster County.

State Senate
Greene County is also divided into two districts in the Missouri Senate, both of which represented by Republicans; District 20, representing large parts of Greene and Christian County, and District 30, representing mostly the city of Springfield.

Federal

All of Greene County is included in Missouri's 7th Congressional District and is currently represented by Billy Long (R-Springfield) in the U.S. House of Representatives.

Political culture

Like most counties situated in Southwest Missouri, Greene County is a Republican stronghold. George W. Bush carried Greene County in 2000 and 2004 by almost two-to-one margins, and like many other counties throughout Southwest Missouri, Greene County favored John McCain over Barack Obama in 2008. In the 2016 presidential election, Donald Trump carried Greene County by a margin of 60% to 33%.  The last Democratic presidential nominee to win Greene County was Lyndon B. Johnson in 1964. In 2004, Missourians voted on a constitutional amendment to define marriage as the union between a man and a woman—it passed Greene County with 72.04 percent of the vote. The initiative passed the state with 71 percent of support from voters as Missouri became the first state to ban same-sex marriage. In 2006, Missourians voted on a constitutional amendment to fund and legalize embryonic stem cell research in the state—it narrowly failed in Greene County with 51.62 percent voting against the measure. The initiative narrowly passed the state with 51 percent of support from voters as Missouri became one of the first states in the nation to approve embryonic stem cell research. Despite Greene County's longstanding tradition of supporting socially conservative platforms, voters in the county have a penchant for advancing populist causes like increasing the minimum wage. In 2006, Missourians voted on a proposition (Proposition B) to increase the minimum wage in the state to $6.50 an hour—it passed Greene County with 74.41 percent of the vote. The proposition strongly passed every single county in Missouri with 78.99 percent voting in favor as the minimum wage was increased to $6.50 an hour in the state. During the same election, voters in five other states also strongly approved increases in the minimum wage. In 2020, Greene County was one of only eight counties in Missouri and the only one outside St. Louis, Kansas City and Columbia to vote yes on Amendment 2 to expand Medicaid - it passed Greene County with 52.3 percent of the vote and statewide with 53.3 percent.

The county is no less Republican at the local level, with Republicans holding all county-level elected offices. Democratic strength is concentrated in Springfield itself, while the suburban and rural areas are powerfully Republican. The two Democrats representing portions of Springfield in the state house are the only elected Democrats representing any portion of the county above the municipal level. However, the county has been known to support Democrats in statewide races. Mel Carnahan carried the county in both of his runs for governor, as did Jay Nixon. In 2000, Bob Holden's victory in the county provided the margin that allowed him to defeat Jim Talent statewide.

The county may be becoming less Republican. During the 2020 Census, it was noted that Springfield's residents were becoming more diverse, with many of these diverse groups tending to support the Democratic party. Indeed, as the population of Springfield has grown, so has the percentage of Democratic voters, mirroring political trends in other conservative urban counties such as Potter County, Texas

Missouri presidential preference primary (2008)

Voters in Greene County from both political parties supported candidates who finished in second place in the state at large and nationally. Although a conservative/Republican stronghold, U.S. Senator Hillary Clinton (D-New York) still received more votes, a total of 18,322, than any candidate from either party in Greene County during the 2008 presidential primary.

Education

Public schools
Ash Grove R-IV School District - Ash Grove
Ash Grove Elementary School - (PK-06)
Bois D'Arc Elementary School - (K-06) - Bois D'Arc
Ash Grove High School - (07-12)
Fair Grove R-X School District] - Fair Grove
Fair Grove Elementary School - (K-04)
Fair Grove Middle School - (05-08)
Fair Grove High School - (09-12)
Logan-Rogersville R-VIII School District - Rogersville
Logan-Rogersville Primary School - (PK-01)
Logan-Rogersville Elementary School - (02-03)
Logan-Rogersville Upper Elementary School - (04-06)
Logan-Rogersville Middle School - (07-08)
Logan-Rogersville High School - (09-12)
Republic R-III School District - Republic
Republic Kindergarten School - (K)
Republic Elementary School I - (01-02)
Republic Elementary School II - (03-04)
Republic Elementary School III - (05-06)
Republic Middle School - (07-08)
Republic High School - (09-12)
Springfield R-XII School District - Springfield
Shady Dell Early Childhood Center - (PK) - Springfield
York Elementary School - (PK-05) - Springfield
Williams Elementary School - (K-05) - Springfield
Wilder Elementary School - (K-05) - Springfield
Westport Elementary School - (K-05) - Springfield
Weller Elementary School - (PK-05) - Springfield
Weaver Elementary School - (K-05) - Springfield
Watkins Elementary School - (PK-05) - Springfield
Truman Elementary School - (K-05) - Springfield
Sunshine Elementary School - (K-05) - Springfield
Sherwood Elementary School - (K-05) - Springfield
Sequiota Elementary School - (K-05) - Springfield
Rountree Elementary School - (K-05) - Springfield
Robberson Elementary School - (K-05) - Springfield
Portland Elementary School - (K-05) - Springfield
Pleasant View Elementary School - (K-05) - Springfield
Pittman Elementary School - (K-05) - Springfield
Pershing Elementary School - (K-05) - Springfield
McGregor Elementary School - (K-05) - Springfield
McBride Elementary School - (K-04) - Springfield
Mark Twain Elementary School - (K-05) - Springfield
Walt Disney Elementary School - (K-05) - Springfield
Jeffries Elementary School - (PK-05) - Springfield
Horace Mann Elementary School - (PK-05) - Springfield
Holland Elementary School - (K-05) - Springfield
Hickory Hills Elementary School - (K-05) - Springfield
Gray Elementary School - (K-04) - Springfield
Fremont Elementary School - (PK-05) - Springfield
Field Elementary School - (K-05) - Springfield
Delaware Elementary School - (K-05) - Springfield
David Harrison Elementary School - (K-04) - Springfield
Cowden Elementary School - (PK-05) - Springfield
Campbell Elementary School - (K-05) - Springfield
Boyd Elementary School - (PK-05) - Springfield
Bowerman Elementary School - (K-05) - Springfield
Bissett Elementary School - (K-05) - Springfield
Bingham Elementary School - (K-05) - Springfield
Wilson's Creek 5-6 Intermediate Center - (05-06) - Battlefield
Study Middle School - (06-08) - Springfield
Reed Middle School - (06-08) - Springfield
Pleasant View Middle School - (06-08) - Springfield
Pipkin Middle School - (06-08) - Springfield
Pershing Middle School - (06-08) - Springfield
Jarrett Middle School - (06-08) - Springfield
Hickory Hills Middle School - (06-08) - Springfield
Cherokee Middle School - (06-08) - Springfield
Carver Middle School - (06-08) - Springfield
Parkview High School - (09-12) - Springfield
Kickapoo High School - (09-12) - Springfield
Hillcrest High School - (09-12) - Springfield
Glendale High School - (09-12) - Springfield
Central High School - (09-12) - Springfield
Strafford R-VI School District - Strafford
Strafford Elementary School - (K-04)
Strafford Middle School - (05-08)
Strafford High School - (09-12)
Walnut Grove R-V School District - Walnut Grove
 Walnut Grove Preschool (PK)
Walnut Grove Elementary School - (K-06)
Walnut Grove High School - (07-12)
Willard R-II School District - Willard
Willard North Elementary School - (PK-04) - Willard
Willard East Elementary School - (K-04) - Willard
Willard South Elementary School - (PK-04) - Springfield
Willard Central Elementary School - (K-04) - Springfield
Willard Intermediate School - (05-06) - Willard
Willard Middle School - (07-08) - Willard
Willard High School - (09-12) - Willard

Private schools
Christian Schools of Springfield - (PK-12) - Springfield - Baptist
Grace Classical Academy - (PK-12) - Springfield - Nondenominational Christianity
Greenwood Laboratory School - (K-12) - Springfield - Nonsectarian
Immaculate Conception School - (PK-8) - Springfield - Roman Catholic
New Covenant Academy - (PK-12) - Springfield - Nondenominatonal Christianity
Springfield Catholic High School - (09-12) - Springfield - Roman Catholic
Springfield Lutheran School  - (PS-8) - Springfield - Lutheran MO Synod
St. Agnes Cathedral School - (PK-8) - Springfield - Roman Catholic
St. Elizabeth Ann Seton School - (PK-5) - Springfield - Roman Catholic
The Summit Preparatory School of Southwest Missouri - (PK-12) - Springfield - Nonsectarian

Alternative/other schools
Bailey Educational Center - (09-12) - Springfield - Alternative/Other School
Community Learning Center - (06-12) - Springfield - Alternative/Other School
Datema House - (05-12) - Springfield - Alternative/Other School
Excel School - (06-12) - Springfield - Alternative/Other School
Graff Career Center - (09-12) - Springfield - Vocational/Technical School
Greene County Special Education Cooperative - (K-12) - Republic - Special Education
Greene Valley - Springfield - Special Education
Phelps Gifted Center - (01-12) - Springfield - Alternative/Other School/Gifted Education
Wilson Creek Group Home - (06-12) - Springfield - Alternative/Other School

Colleges and universities
Missouri State University - Springfield - Formerly known as Southwest Missouri State University - A public, four-year university.
Evangel University - Springfield - A private, four-year Pentecostal liberal arts university.
Drury University - Springfield - A private, four-year liberal arts university.
Baptist Bible College - Springfield - A private, conservative Bible college owned by the Baptist Bible Fellowship International.
Ozarks Technical Community College - Springfield - A public, two-year community college.
Ozarks Technical Community College - Republic - A public, two-year community college.
Everest College - Springfield - A public, four-year for-profit Corinthian college.
Columbia College: Springfield Campus - Springfield - A private, four-year college.
Bryan University: Springfield Campus - Springfield - A private, four-year university.
Cox College - Springfield - A private, four-year non-profit nursing college.
University of Missouri: Springfield Clinical Campus] - Springfield - A public, four-year university.

Public libraries
Springfield-Greene County Library

Transportation

Major highways

  Interstate 44
  U.S. Route 60
  U.S. Route 65
  U.S. Route 66 (1926–1979)
  U.S. Route 160
  Route 13
  Route 125
  Route 266
  Route 360
  Route 413
  Route 744

Airports
 Springfield-Branson National Airport
 Springfield Downtown Airport

Communities

Cities and towns

Ash Grove
Battlefield
Fair Grove
Republic
Rogersville
Springfield (county seat)
Strafford
Walnut Grove
Willard

Unincorporated communities

 Avalon Park
 Bois D'Arc
 Cave Spring
 Cody
 Ebenezer
 Elwood
 Glidewell
 Hackney
 Harold
 Haseltine
 Hickory Barren
 Logan
 Mentor
 Mumford
 Oak Grove Heights
 Palmetto
 Pearl
 Phenix
 Plano
 Turners

Notable people

See also
List of counties in Missouri
National Register of Historic Places listings in Greene County, Missouri

References

External links
Greene County government's website
Information about Springfield, MO
Greene County message board
 Digitized 1930 Plat Book of Greene County  from University of Missouri Division of Special Collections, Archives, and Rare Books
 Downtown Springfield

 
Missouri counties
Springfield metropolitan area, Missouri
1833 establishments in Missouri
Populated places established in 1833